The India men's national under-21 field hockey team represent India in men's international under-21 field hockey competitions. It is controlled by Hockey India, the governing body for field hockey in India. They are one of the most successful junior field hockey team in the world having won the World Cup twice and Asia Cup thrice.

Tournament record

See also
India men's national field hockey team
India women's national under-21 field hockey team

References

Men's national under-21 field hockey teams
Under-21
Field hockey teams in India
Field hockey